Mamsell Nitouche is a 1932 French-German operetta film directed by Carl Lamac and starring Anny Ondra, Georg Alexander and Oskar Karlweis. The film is the German-language version of the 1931 French film , directed by Marc Allégret. Both films are based on the 1883 operetta Mam'zelle Nitouche. The film's art direction was by Heinz Fenchel. It premiered at the Ufa-Palast am Zoo in February 1932.

Cast
 Anny Ondra as Mamselle Nitouche
 Georg Alexander as Leutnant Champlatreux
 Oskar Karlweis as Célestin, organist
 Hans Junkermann as Major Gibus
 Julia Serda as Die Oberin, Madame Audrin
 Yvonne Albinus as Corinne
 Karl Forest as Theaterdirektor

References

Bibliography

External links

1932 films
Films of the Weimar Republic
1930s historical musical films
French historical musical films
German historical musical films
1930s German-language films
Films directed by Karel Lamač
Operetta films
Films based on operettas
German multilingual films
Films set in the 1880s
UFA GmbH films
German black-and-white films
French black-and-white films
1932 multilingual films
1930s German films
1930s French films
German-language French films